is a village located in Shiribeshi Subprefecture, Hokkaido, Japan.

As of September 2016, the village has an estimated population of 1,560. The total area is 437.26 km2.

Geography
Shimamaki is located on the southern of the Shiribeshi Subprefecture. The name is derived from the Ainu word "Shuma-ko-mak", which means "Behind rocks".

Neighboring towns
 Shiribeshi Subprefecture
 Suttsu
 Kuromatsunai
 Hiyama Subprefecture
 Imakane
 Setana
 Oshima Subprefecture
 Oshamambe

History
1906: The village of Higashishimamaki and the village of Nishishimamaki were founded.
1956: Two villages were merged to form the new village of Shimamaki.

Industries
The main industry of Shimamaki is fishery. Thirty percent of the villagers are engaged in it.

Education
 Elementary school
 Shimamaki Elementary School
 Junior high school
 Shimamaki Junior High School

References

External links

Official Website 

Villages in Hokkaido